Tommasone is a surname. Notable people with the surname include:

Carmine Tommasone (born 1984), Italian boxer
Cyril Tommasone (born 1987), French gymnast
Vincenzo Tommasone (born 1995), Italian footballer